Abdallah ibn Muhammad ibn Ibrahim al-Zaynabi was a minor Abbasid prince. He served as the governor of several provinces, including the Yemen and Egypt, in the late eighth and early ninth centuries.

Life
A member of the Abbasid dynasty, Abdallah was the descendant of notable personages on both sides of his family. His father Muhammad was a son of Ibrahim ibn Muhammad ibn Ali, who had been a leading figure in the early stages of the Abbasid Revolution before being killed by the last Umayyad caliph Marwan II in 749. His mother, Zaynab, was the daughter of Sulayman ibn Ali and a senior princess at the Abbasid court, and Abdallah himself was usually known by the names of "al-Zaynabi" or "Abdallah ibn Zaynab." He was a second cousin of the fourth and fifth Abbasid caliphs al-Hadi and Harun al-Rashid.

During his career Abdallah was appointed to several provincial governorships. Either during the caliphate of al-Hadi or al-Mahdi he was made governor of the Yemen, and under Harun al-Rashid he was once or twice governor of Mecca (and possibly Medina). In 805 he was appointed over Egypt, in which position he remained for approximately a year.

Abdallah was also known for leading the prayers at the funeral of Malik ibn Anas in 795.

Notes

References
 
 
 
 
 
 
  
 
 

Abbasid governors of Yemen
Abbasid governors of Egypt
Abbasids
8th-century people from the Abbasid Caliphate
9th-century Abbasid governors of Egypt
9th-century Arabs
Abbasid governors of Mecca
Abbasid governors of Medina